Patrick Friday Eze (born 22 December 1992) is a Nigerian professional footballer who plays as a forward for Turkish club Ankara Keçiörengücü.

Career
In his homeland, Eze played with Ajiya Babes and Zamfara United, before moving abroad to Ivorian club Africa Sports in 2011. He won the national championship in his first season with the side. Eze subsequently appeared for Africa Sports in the qualification phase for the 2012 CAF Champions League.

In the summer of 2013, Eze moved to Serbia and signed with SuperLiga side Rad. He was transferred to fellow top league club Napredak Kruševac in the 2014 winter transfer window, failing to make an impact with both sides. In the summer of 2014, Eze signed with newly promoted Mladost Lučani. He scored a hat-trick in a 3–2 home league victory over Spartak Subotica on 7 March 2015. Eze finished the season as the league's top scorer with 15 goals.

In July 2015, Eze moved to the United Arab Emirates and signed with Fujairah. He was the team's top scorer in the 2015–16 season, netting 14 goals from 24 league appearances, as the club suffered relegation from the UAE Pro League. In July 2016, Eze was sent on a season-long loan to Saudi club Al Qadsiah.

In August 2017, Eze was transferred to Turkish club Konyaspor, penning a three-year contract. He was later loaned to Denizlispor in January 2018.

After spending several months without a club, Eze signed with Polish club Raków Częstochowa in early 2019. He left the club at the end of the season where his contract expired. On 20 October 2019, Eze joined Jordanian club Al-Ramtha SC.

Statistics

Honours

Club
Africa Sports
 Ligue 1: 2011

Individual
 Serbian SuperLiga Top Scorer: 2014–15
 Serbian SuperLiga Team of the Season: 2014–15

References

External links
 
 
 
 

Nigerian footballers
Sportspeople from Kaduna
1992 births
Living people
Africa Sports d'Abidjan players
Fujairah FC players
Al-Qadsiah FC players
Association football forwards
Zamfara United F.C. players
Denizlispor footballers
FK Mladost Lučani players
FK Napredak Kruševac players
FK Rad players
Konyaspor footballers
Raków Częstochowa players
Al-Ramtha SC players
FK Kukësi players
Al Ahli SC (Doha) players
Ankara Keçiörengücü S.K. footballers
Serbian SuperLiga players
Süper Lig players
TFF First League players
UAE Pro League players
Saudi Professional League players
I liga players
Jordanian Pro League players
Kategoria Superiore players
Qatar Stars League players
Nigerian expatriate footballers
Nigerian expatriate sportspeople in Ivory Coast
Nigerian expatriate sportspeople in Poland
Nigerian expatriate sportspeople in Serbia
Nigerian expatriate sportspeople in the United Arab Emirates
Nigerian expatriate sportspeople in Saudi Arabia
Nigerian expatriate sportspeople in Turkey
Nigerian expatriate sportspeople in Jordan
Nigerian expatriate sportspeople in Albania
Nigerian expatriate sportspeople in Qatar
Expatriate footballers in Ivory Coast
Expatriate footballers in Poland
Expatriate footballers in Serbia
Expatriate footballers in the United Arab Emirates
Expatriate footballers in Saudi Arabia
Expatriate footballers in Turkey
Expatriate footballers in Jordan
Expatriate footballers in Albania
Expatriate footballers in Qatar